Boris Van Berkum (born 30 April 1968) is a Dutch visual artist who was born, has lived, and works in Rotterdam, the  Netherlands.

Biography 
He was educated at the Montessori Lyceum and the Willem de Kooning Academie both in Rotterdam, then at the Academy of Fine Arts in Prague.

He has worked as a cartoonist, and performance artist, known as DJ Chantelle, and was founder/curator of the Showroom MAMA - where he curated for several years. He has also been an artist in residence at a number of institutions, and was the Art Editor of Rails Magazine Netherlands from November 2006 to August 2008.

Boris Van Berkum has been a member of the Thinktank, the Voorrang Culturele Vakmanschaf (Committee for Advanced Craft and Technology Vocational Education) from 2008 onwards. He served on the Advisory Committee to the Dutch Secretary of State for Culture in 2002, the Selection Committee of the Fonds Beeldende kunsten Vormgeving en Bouwkunst in 2001, and the Project Grants Committee for the Center for Fine Arts, Rotterdam, from 2000 to 2002.

He is represented by the Witzenhausen Gallery in Amsterdam.

Solo exhibitions
 A Sublime Resurrection TBS Winiek Kijvelanden, Roohn, The Netherlands, November 2008
 A Spiritual Moment after Battle Artspace Witzenhausen, Art Amsterdam, The Netherlands, May 2007

Group exhibitions
Group exhibitions have included:
 A Free Entreprise, Van Abbehus-Peninsula, Eindhoven, The Netherlands, September 2008
 The Urban Tendency, London, July 2008
 Art Amsterdam, Amsterdam, May 2008
 Against Nature, Vegas Gallery, London, 2008

Performances
 Ma Vie en Rose, Arminius, Rotterdam
 Chantelle Chanteuse, Zaal de Unie, Rotterdam

References

External links
 Boris Van Berkum

Living people
1968 births
Artists from Rotterdam
Dutch sculptors
Dutch male sculptors
Dutch art curators
Academy of Fine Arts, Prague alumni